The men's shot put event at the 2008 World Junior Championships in Athletics was held in Bydgoszcz, Poland, at Zawisza Stadium on 8 July.  A 6 kg (junior implement) shot was used.

Medalists

Results

Final
8 July

Qualifications
8 July

Group A

Group B

Participation
According to an unofficial count, 36 athletes from 28 countries participated in the event.

References

Shot put
Shot put at the World Athletics U20 Championships